

The Agusan image (commonly referred to in the Philippines as the Golden Tara in allusion to its supposed, but disputed, identity as an image of a Buddhist Tara) is a , 21-karat gold statuette, found in 1917 on the banks of the Wawa River near Esperanza, Agusan del Sur, Mindanao in the Philippines, dating to the 9th–10th centuries. It is now on display in the Field Museum of Natural History in Chicago.

Since its discovery, the identity of the goddess represented by the gold statuette has been the subject of debate. Proposed identities of the gold figurine range from that of a Hindu Sivaite goddess to a Buddhist Tara. Recent scholarship suggests that the image represents the offering goddess Vajralāsyā of the Tantric Buddhist tradition.

Identity
H. Otley Beyer believed that the image was that of a Hindu Sivaite goddess, but with the religiously important hand signals improperly copied by local workmen. Thus it suggests that Hinduism was already in the Philippines before Ferdinand Magellan arrived, but also suggests that the early Filipinos had an imperfect version of Hinduism adopted from the Majapahit Empire. Natives back then were not converted into Hinduism, rather, they absorbed traditions in Hinduism while retaining their own indigenous Anitist religions. 
This golden Agusan image seems to be modelled after — or copied — the Nganjuk bronze images of early Majapahit period.

Juan R. Francisco on the other hand found the conclusion of Beyer regarding the identity of the golden image as questionable. Specifically, he questioned Beyer's assumptions that: (1) "Butuan" means "phallus (the origin of the name "Butuan" is still under discussion); (2) that the king of Butuan, being not a Muslim, should therefore be a Hindu of the Saiva persuasion; (3) that the existence of other Sivaite images discovered among the Mandayas (south of where the Agusan image was discovered) and in Cebu should support his conclusions regarding the female Sivaite goddess identity of the golden statuette. Regarding the last assumption, Francisco pointed out that the identity of the other supposedly "Sivaite" images mentioned by Beyer (all of which were destroyed by the fire that consumed the Ateneo de Manila Museum in the early 1930s) is also questionable, since John Carroll, who examined a photograph of the Cebu image, believed that it is an "Avalokitesvara, not a Siva". Francisco, on the basis of the re-study of the gold statue, believed that it represents a Buddhist Tara.

Another proposed identity of the Agusan image is the offering goddess Vajralāsyā, one of the four female deities located in the inner circle of a mandala called the Diamond Realm (Vajradhātu). Mandalas like the Diamond Realm Mandala of Tantric Buddhism are elaborate diagrams that represent the cosmos in a metaphorical or symbolic manner. Mandalas can be represented as two-dimensional (either temporarily drawn on flat surfaces, painted on cloth, or etched on metal plates), as three-dimensional sculptural tableaux, or as large architectural constructions like the Borobudur in Central Java. Three-dimensional mandalas are thought to have been used for sacred rituals involving the offering of water, flowers, incense, lamps, unguents, etc.

The Diamond Realm Mandala is one of the well-known and well-documented of the early Buddhist mandalas. Located at the center of such mandala is the Buddha Vairocana, surrounded by an inner circle of deities. The four cosmic Buddhas occupy the four cardinal points of the inner circle, each of which is surrounded by four attendants, while the four offering goddesses sit at the inner circle's four corners. The four inner goddesses associated with offerings made to the Buddha Vairocana are Vajralāsyā ("amorous dance", sitting at the southeast corner), Vajramālā ("garland", sitting at the southwest), Vajragītā ("song", sitting at the northwest), and Vajramṛtyā ("dance", sitting at the northeast). In the outer circle are sixteen further deities, four arranged along each of the four cardinal directions, while at the interstitial corners are four more "outer" offering goddesses. The outer circle is surrounded by 1000 more buddhas and 24 deities who guard the boundaries, while four guardian deities protect the four portals at the four cardinal directions.

The Tibetan scholar Rob Linrothe was one of the first to recognize the Agusan image as Vajralāsyā, who is always shown with her hands on her hips. Florina Capistrano-Baker agrees with this conclusion, noting the similarities in style between the Agusan golden image and the other statuettes belonging to a three-dimensional Diamond Realm Mandala set such as the four bronze deities discovered in Nganjuk, Java (believed to represent the four offering goddesses of the outer circle). The shared characteristics between the Nganjuk figurines and the Agusan golden image were already suggested back then in 1920 by the Dutch scholar F. D. K. Bosch, however it was ignored at that time because no illustrations of the bronze figurines were presented. Recent scholarship is now re-evaluating the relationship between the Agusan golden image and the Nganjuk bronze deities as they are believed to have been made around the same time (10th–11th centuries). Identification of the gold figurine with the offering goddess Vajralāsyā also implies that it is but a singular part of a larger set of offering deities associated with the Diamond Realm mandala, the whereabouts of which remains unknown and are most likely lost in time.

One of the factors that makes the identification of the image by scholars difficult is the fact that it has no specific iconographic attributes. The goldsmiths in the Philippines knew of Hindu and Buddhist artistic conventions, but did not include motifs which would identify them as specific deities. Philippine goldsmiths may have done this intentionally to maintain their ethnic identity.

History

In 1917, the Agusan image was found by a Manobo woman along the banks of the Wawa River near Esperanza, Agusan del Sur. She kept the artifact as a manika (doll) until it was acquired by the then Agusan Deputy Governor Blas Baklagon, after which it gained the name Buwawan ni Baklagon (Gold of Baklagon). However, according to Constancia Guiral, the granddaughter of the discoverer of the gold image, her grandmother named Belay Campos kept the item as a manika (doll) and later placed it on an altar for worship until it was stolen from their traditional Manobo house. It then ended up in the hands of Blas Baklagon. In 1918, Baklagon brought the artifact to the attention of Dr. H. Otley Beyer, who called it "the most spectacular single find yet made in Philippine archeology". Beyer, who was then the chair of the Department of Anthropology at the University of the Philippines and thus also serving as an honorary curator at the National Museum of the Philippines, attempted to convince the American colonial government in the Philippines to purchase the Agusan image for the National Museum of the Philippines in Manila. However, the government failed to purchase the artifact due to lack of funds. Ownership next passed to the Agusan Coconut Company to whom Blas Baklagon owed a debt. News of its existence eventually reached important people such as Louise Wood, whose husband Leonard Wood served as American governor-general in the Philippines. Fearing that the image might be melted down for its value in gold, Mrs. Wood conducted a fundraising campaign to collect funds for the purchase of the gold artifact. She enlisted the help of Fay-Cooper Cole, the curator of Chicago Field Museum's Southeast Asian department, together with Shaler Matthews, a professor at the University of Chicago, for the fundraising campaign. Their efforts paid off when the image was finally acquired for the museum in 1922 for ₱4,000.00. The image was then shipped to the United States in 1922 and was finally housed at the Field Museum of Natural History in Chicago, where it is still stored up to this day. Since the 21st century, the site in Agusan where the image was found has become a pilgrimage site for Buddhists and animists alike.

Recovery
The artifact has been a source of conflict between Filipinos and Americans for many years, and many Filipino scholars have demanded its return. It is seen as a national treasure of the country, unreported during the time of its discovery, and sold to Americans during a period of national financial difficulty leading to the inability of the Philippine government to purchase the artifact when it was auctioned. Scholars have argued that if the reason the Field Museum took the artifact was due to fear of it may have been melted down, then the Field Museum should return it, or at least allow the Philippines to purchase back the artifact since the scenario that involves the image being melted down for its gold is now unlikely.

Also mentioned is how the artifact was bought by an American museum during a time when the Philippines was in financial duress and under the colonial government of America. One of the major advocates for the return of the Agusan image is former Senator Aquilino Pimentel Jr., who made his last privilege speech specifically for the purpose of advocating for its repatriation to the Philippines. The Field Museum in Chicago has stated that it may return the golden image if it is "strongly requested" by the Philippine government.

In April 2018, a documentary from GMA Network featured the Agusan image, this time showing the people of Agusan del Sur supporting the repatriation of the figurine. Scholars have also found a document proving the Philippines' right to claim the artifact. The scholars, in partnership with the government, have been tasked to pursue the Philippine claim on the golden image, which remains on display in the Field Museum in Chicago, United States. The native people of Agusan also want the statue to be returned as they worship it as a holy relic.

See also 

 Indian influences in early Philippine polities
 Buddhism in the Philippines
 Hinduism in the Philippines
 Tabon Caves Garuda Gold Pendant
 Laguna Copperplate Inscription
 History of the Philippines
 Butuan (historical polity)
 Balangiga bells

Sources 

1917 archaeological discoveries
Archaeology of the Philippines
Bodhisattvas
Buddhist sculpture